Strafgesetzbuch, abbreviated to StGB, is the German penal code.

History 

In Germany the Strafgesetzbuch goes back to the Penal Code of the German Empire passed in the year 1871 on May 15 in Reichstag which was largely identical to the Penal Code of the North German Confederation from 1870. It came into effect on January 1, 1872.

This Reichsstrafgesetzbuch (Imperial Penal Code) was changed many times in the following decades in response not only to changing moral concepts and constitutional provision granted by the Grundgesetz, but also to scientific and technical reforms. Examples of such new crimes are money laundering or computer sabotage.

The Penal Code is a codification of criminal law and the pivotal legal text, while supplementary laws contain provisions affecting criminal law, such as definitions of new types of crime and law enforcement action. The StGB constitutes the legal basis of criminal law in Germany.

After the defeat of Nazi Germany, a number of prohibiting provisions were included in the Strafgesetzbuch:
 Friedensverrat ("treason to peace"): preparation of a war of aggression (§ 80; since 2017 § 13 Völkerstrafgesetzbuch) and incitement to a war of aggression (§ 80a)
 dissemination of means of propaganda of unconstitutional organizations (§ 86)
 use of symbols of unconstitutional organizations (§ 86a)
 incitement to hatred against segments of the population (Volksverhetzung) (§ 130)

In 2002 German public prosecutors were empowered to prosecute crimes against humanity, war crimes and genocide internationally under the Völkerstrafgesetzbuch ("Code of Crimes against international Law"). Another special penal code is the Wehrstrafgesetz to prosecute special crimes within military service such as insubordination (§20 WStG) and desertion (§16 WStG).

Structure 

The German Penal Code is divided into two main parts:

General Part (Allgemeiner Teil): in which general issues are arranged, for example:
 Area of the law's validity
 Law-related definitions
 Capacity to be adjudged guilty
 Perpetration and incitement or accessoryship
 Necessary defence
 General provisions for punishments (fines and imprisonment)
 Statutes of limitations
 Attempts

Special Part (Besonderer Teil): in which the different criminal offences and their definitions and punishments are listed, for example:
 Crimes against the democratic rule of law
 Crimes against public order
 Crimes against the person of a sexual nature
 Crimes against life
 Crimes against another person's wealth (for example robbery and theft)

Notable sections
These sections differ significantly from the criminal codes in other countries, and/or are relevant for topics discussed in other articles.

§ 86a: Use of symbols of unconstitutional organisations

Outlaws the distribution or public use of symbols of unconstitutional groups, in particular, flags, insignia, uniforms, slogans and forms of greeting. The laws ban most Nazi insignia from any usage for propagating the ideology outside artistic, scientific, research, or opposition uses (swastikas, SS sig runes, Totenkopf, Othala rune, the neo-Nazi version of the Celtic Cross, the swastikas versions of the Iron Cross and Reichsadler, Wolfsangel, the party and Reichkriegsflagge Nazi flags, the Sturmabteilung emblem, the Nazi salute and the greetings "Heil Hitler" or "Sieg Heil",  are outlawed under the law) it also extends to bans on symbols of the Communist Party of Germany (Hammer and sickle, red star and red flag are under it), ISIS Black Standard, and Kurdish People's Protection Units (YPG) pennant.

This section has been the basis for the confiscation of video games like Wolfenstein 3D or Mortyr and the censorship of Nazi symbolism in World War II-related media until August 2018.

§ 103: Insulting of organs and representatives of foreign states (repealed)

Turkish president Recep Tayyip Erdoğan himself made a complaint 2016 against  German satirist Jan Böhmermann as a private person because of the alleged insulting. The Deputy Prime Minister of Turkey, Numan Kurtulmuş, called the poem a "serious crime against humanity".

On 1 June 2017 the German Bundestag decided by a unanimous vote to repeal this section. This decision went into effect on 1 January 2018.

§ 130: Sedition 
Section 3 outlaws denying the genocide committed under the rule of National Socialism (1933–1945). Section 4 prohibits glorifying or approving the reign of the Nazis.

§ 130: Incitement to hatred (Volksverhetzung) 

Section 130 makes it a crime to:

 incite hatred against segments of the population or call for violent or arbitrary measures against them in a manner capable of disturbing the peace
 to insult, maliciously malign, or defame segments of the population in a manner capable of disturbing the peace
 disseminate, publicly make accessible, produce, obtain, supply, stock, offer, announce, commend, undertake to import or export, or facilitate such use by another of written materials that assaults the human dignity of others by insulting, maliciously maligning or defaming segments of the population or a previously indicated group
 approve of, deny or downplay an act committed under the rule of National Socialism in a manner capable of disturbing the peace
This section is often applied to trials related to Holocaust denial.

§ 131: Representation of violence (Gewaltdarstellung)
Outlaws the dissemination or public display of media "which describe cruel or otherwise inhuman acts of violence against human or humanoid beings in a manner which expresses a glorification or rendering harmless of such acts of violence or which represents the cruel or inhuman aspects of the event in a manner which injures human dignity".

This section was used as the legal basis for confiscating all horror movies and a few video games such as Mortal Kombat, Manhunt, and Condemned.

§ 140: Rewarding and approving crimes
Outlaws rewarding or approving of crimes "publicly, in a meeting or through dissemination of writings […], and in a manner that is capable of disturbing the public peace". This only applies to crimes where failure to report is an offense (§ 138), among them preparation of a war of aggression (§ 80), murder, robbery, treason, and counterfeiting money.

This section formed the grounds for the lawsuit against Holger Voss.

§ 175: Homosexual acts between men (repealed)

This section, which was in force in some form or other from 1871 to 1994, criminalized sexual acts between males under circumstances that varied as the law was modified over the years. Acts between consenting adults, if not done in the context of prostitution, were excluded from prosecution in 1969. Until 1969 the section also criminalized sexual acts between humans and animals. No corresponding legislation against lesbian sex acts existed.

§ 202c: Preparation of data espionage or data interception

Highly controversial, it outlaws the preparation of an act of data espionage (§ 202a) or data interception (§ 202b) by making, obtaining, selling, distributing (or otherwise committing or making accessible to others)
 passwords or security codes to access data, or
 computer programs whose purpose is to commit such an act.

As the definition of a "program with the purpose of committing data espionage or data interception" is quite vague, there is a lot of debate how this new prohibition is to be handled in court, since software essential to system or network security might be seen to fall under this act as well. Too extensive an interpretation will surely collide with the freedom of exercise of occupation as well as the right to property (Articles 12 and 14 of the Basic Law).

§ 211: Murder (under aggravating circumstances)

In German: Mord. The intentional, successful killing of another person, with at least one of the aggravating circumstances mentioned in § 211 sec.2 fulfilled. Those circumstances concern base motives, criminal aims or cruel ways of committing the crime. An intentional killing that does not qualify for Mord is called Totschlag (§ 212). § 211 is the only crime within the Strafgesetzbuch that carries a mandatory sentence of life imprisonment (a sentence of life without parole is not expressly provided for in German law, but it is possible certain convicts of murder can spend the rest of their lives in prison).

§ 218: Abortion

Regulating abortion, in combination with § 218a. Revised several times, with an 1974 liberalization declared unconstitutional by the courts, and historically very controversial. After a multi-partisan compromise was reached during the early 1990s, it permits abortion during the first trimester, upon condition of mandatory counseling and a waiting period, and in rare exceptional cases afterwards. After this compromise was found, there has been relatively little further controversy about the section.

§ 323c: Duty to Rescue

This section requires everybody to "render assistance during accidents or a common danger or emergency" if necessary, as far as can be expected ("under the circumstances, particularly if it is possible without substantial danger to himself and without violation of other important duties"). Refusing to assist can be punished with up to one year of imprisonment. As a consequence, should an attempt at first aid prove unsuccessful or actually harmful, it will not be prosecuted (Good Samaritan law). Note that while the duty, in itself, only exists so far as one is actually capable of providing aid, having passed a course in first aid is required for a driving license, and thus on this level is expected from all motorised traffic participants.

References

External links

Full law texts
German Strafgesetzbuch (in English)
 German Strafgesetzbuch
 Strafgesetzbuch für das Deutsche Reich vom 15. Mai 1871. Current version with links to all versions since inception
 Strafgesetzbuch für das Deutsche Reich vom 15. Mai 1871. Historisch-synoptische Edition. 1871-2009 – all versions since inception with enforcement periods and synopses

Special topics
 List of symbols in violation of § 86a

Criminal codes
German criminal law
1871 in law
1871 in Germany
Penal